The 1976 1. divisjon was the 32nd completed season of top division football in Norway.

Overview
It was contested by 12 teams, and Lillestrøm SK won the championship, their second league title.

Teams and locations
''Note: Table lists in alphabetical order.

League table

Results

Season statistics

Top scorer
 Jan Fuglset, Molde – 17 goals

Attendances

References
Norway - List of final tables (RSSSF)
Norsk internasjonal fotballstatistikk (NIFS)

Eliteserien seasons
Norway
Norway
1